Aq Dash (also Romanized as Āq Dāsh; also known as Agdash and Āghdāsh) is a village in Esperan Rural District, in the Central District of Tabriz County, East Azerbaijan Province, Iran. At the 2006 census, its population was 117, in 33 families.

References 

Populated places in Tabriz County